Weyant is a surname. Notable people with the surname include:

Anna Weyant (born 1995), American painter
Carl Weyant (born 1983), American actor, writer, producer, model, and musician
Chuck Weyant (1923–2017), American racecar driver
John Weyant (born 1947), American academic